The Rurik dynasty (literally "sons/scions of Rurik"), also known as the Rurikid dynasty or Rurikids (or Riurikid dynasty or Riurikids), was a noble lineage allegedly founded by the Varangian prince Rurik, who according to tradition established himself in Novgorod around the year AD 862. The Rurikids were the ruling dynasty of Kievan Rus' (after the conquest of Kiev by Oleg of Novgorod in 882) before it finally disintegrated in the mid-13th century, as well as the successor Rus' principalities and Rus' prince republics of Novgorod, Pskov, Vladimir-Suzdal, Ryazan, Smolensk, Galicia-Volhynia (after 1199), Chernigov, and the Grand Duchy of Moscow (from 1263).

Following the disintegration of Kievan Rus', the most powerful state to eventually arise was the Grand Duchy of Moscow, initially a part of Vladimir-Suzdal, which, along with the Novgorod Republic, established the basis of the modern Russian nation. Ivan III threw off the control of the Golden Horde and consolidated the whole of central and northern Rus', ruling it as "Prince of All Rus. Ivan IV assumed the title "Tsar of All Rus and transformed the state into the Tsardom of Russia. The Rurik line ruled until 1598, following which they were succeeded by the House of Romanov, after the Time of Troubles.

The Romanovichi branch of the dynasty ruled southwestern Rus' and part of central Rus'. These territories were unified by Roman the Great and his son Daniel Romanovich, who was in 1253 crowned by Pope Innocent IV as king of Galicia–Volhynia. After the line's extinction, the principality was annexed by Poland and Lithuania, and the title of its prince eventually passed to the ruler of Austro-Hungary. According to Ukrainian historiography continuous Rurikid sovereignty from the ninth century to the fourteenth represents part of Ukraine's historical process. In Ukrainian historiography of the 19th century, Ukrainian historiographer Mykhailo Hrushevsky, who wrote a book under a similar name, referred to Rus' civilization as Ukraine-Rus'. According to his studies Rus' is not considered to have ended in 1240, but merely to have shifted its centre slightly westward.

As a ruling dynasty, the Rurik dynasty held its own in some parts of Rus' for a total of twenty-one generations in male-line succession, from Rurik (died 879) to Feodor I of Russia (died 1598), a period of more than 700 years. They are one of Europe's oldest royal houses, with numerous existing cadet branches.

Origins

Genealogical issues 
The origins of the Rurik dynasty are unclear, as its namesake Rurik, a Varangian prince who allegedly founded the dynasty in 862 through the "Invitation of the Varangians", is considered to be a legendary, mythical and perhaps even entirely fictional character by modern scholars. Nicholas V. Riasanovsky (1947) stated: '...no Kievan sources anterior to the Primary Chronicle (early twelfth century), knew of Riurik. In tracing the ancestry of Kievan princes they usually stopped with Igor.' As an example, Hilarion of Kiev's Sermon on Law and Grace (1050s), praising Volodimer I of Kiev, only goes back to his father Sviatoslav I and grandfather Igor of Kiev. Even if Rurik did exist, scholars have long doubted or rejected his paternity of Igor. The connections between Rurik, Oleg and Igor, as attested in the Primary Chronicle and Novgorod First Chronicle, are tenuous at best; in all other cases, these two chronicles base any particular ruler's legitimacy on the fact that their father or grandfather previously "sat on the throne in Kiev", and never refer back to Rurik. Legitimacy in the Kievan Chronicle is also heavily based on a ruler being descended from his father and grandfather, with the exception of two 5-generation lists. Before the mid-15th century, no historical source claims that Rurik founded a dynasty; the Hypatian Codex of  1425 began its list of knyazi of Kiev with "Dir and Askold", then "Oleg", then "Igor", up to 1240, and does not mention Rurik anywhere. It was not until the 16th century that Rus' churchmen developed an explicit tradition, described in the 1560 Book of Royal Degrees by Macarius, Metropolitan of Moscow, according to which the reigning Danilovichi house of the Grand Duchy of Moscow (Muscovy) was part of a "Rurikid dynasty", which not only traced back all the way to the legendary Rurik, but was purportedly descended from a certain Prus, a supposed kinsman of Augustus Caesar. According Ostrowski (2018), the Rus' churchmen developed this concept of a R(i)urikid dynasty for the purpose of "bolstering the Muscovite dynastic state". Although many later historians would accept the 16th-century Rus' churchmen's dynastic claim that the Danilovichi were descended from Rurik, they did not accept Prus as the ancestor of the Muscovite princes. Because of these issues, various scholars have instead named the dynasty the Volodimerovichi (Volydymyrovichi), descendants of grand prince Volodimer I of Kiev.

Ethnographic issues 

The scholarly consensus is that the Rus' people originated in what is currently coastal eastern Sweden around the eighth century and that their name has the same origin as Roslagen in Sweden (with the older name being Roden).

According to the prevalent theory, the name Rus, like the Proto-Finnic name for Sweden (*Ruotsi), is derived from an Old Norse term for "the men who row" (rods-) as rowing was the main method of navigating the rivers of Eastern Europe, and that it could be linked to the Swedish coastal area of Roslagen (Rus-law) or Roden, as it was known in earlier times. The name Rus would then have the same origin as the Finnish and Estonian names for Sweden: Ruotsi and Rootsi.

The Primary Chronicle gives the following account the "Invitation of the Varangians", dating it to the Byzantine years of the world 6368–6370 (AD 860–862):

There is some ambiguity even in the Primary Chronicle about the specifics of the story, "hence their paradoxical statement 'the people of Novgorod are of Varangian stock, for formerly they were Slovenes. However, archaeological evidence such as "Frankish swords, a sword chape and a tortoiseshell brooch" in the area suggest that there was, in fact, a Scandinavian population during the tenth century at the latest.

History 

Rurik and his brothers founded a state that later historians called Kievan Rus′. By the middle of the twelfth century, Kievan Rus′ had dissolved into independent principalities, each ruled by a different branch of the Rurik dynasty. The dynasty followed agnatic seniority and the izgoi principle. The Rurik dynasty underwent a major schism after the death of Yaroslav the Wise in 1054, dividing into three branches on the basis of descent from three successive ruling Grand Princes: Iziaslav (1024–1078), Sviatoslav (1027–1076), and Vsevolod (1030–1093). In addition, a line of Polotsk princes assimilated themselves with the princes of Lithuania. In the 10th century the Council of Liubech made some amendments to a succession rule and divided Ruthenia into several autonomous principalities that had equal rights to obtain the Kievan throne.

Vsevolod's line eventually became better known as the Monomakhovichi and was the predominant one. The line of Sviatoslav later became known as Olegovychi and often laid claim to the lands of Chernihiv and Severia. The Izyaslavychi who ruled Turov and Volhynia were eventually replaced by a Monomakhovychi branch.

According to Jaroslav Pelenski,

This caused the Rurik dynasty to effectively dissolve into several sub-dynasties ruling smaller states in the 10th and 11th centuries.  These were the Olgoviches of Severia who ruled in Chernigov, Yuryeviches who controlled Vladimir-Suzdal, and Romanoviches in Galicia-Volhynia.

Descendants of Sviatoslav II of Kiev
The Olgoviches descended from Oleg I of Chernigov, a son of Sviatoslav II of Kiev and grandson of Yaroslav the Wise.  They continued to rule until the early 14th century when they were torn apart by the emerging Grand Duchy of Lithuania and Grand Duchy of Moscow. The line continued through Oleg's son Vsevolod II of Kiev, grandson Sviatoslav III of Kiev, great-grandson Vsevolod IV of Kiev and great-great-grandson Michael of Chernigov, from whose sons the extant lines of the Olegoviches are descended, including the Massalsky, Gorchakov, Baryatinsky, Volkonsky and Obolensky, including Repnin.

Descendants of Vsevolod I of Kiev
Vsevolod I of Kiev was the father of Vladimir II Monomakh, giving rise to the name Monomakh for his progeny. Two of Vladimir II's sons were Mstislav I of Kiev and Yuri Dolgorukiy.

The Romanoviches (Izyaslavichi of Volhynia) were the line of Roman the Great, descended from Mstislav I of Kiev through his son Iziaslav II of Kiev and his grandson Mstislav II of Kiev, father of Roman the Great. The older Monomakhovychi line that ruled the Principality of Volhynia were eventually crowned kings of Galicia and Volhynia and ruled until 1323. The Romanovychi displaced the older line of Izyaslavychi from Turov and Volhynia as well as Rostyslavychi from Galicia. The last were two brothers of Romanovychi, Andrew and Lev II, who ruled jointly and were slain trying to repel Mongol incursions. The Polish king, Władysław I the Elbow-high, in his letter to the Pope wrote with regret: "The two last Ruthenian kings, that had been firm shields for Poland from the Tatars, left this world and after their death Poland is directly under Tatar threat." Losing their leadership role, the Rurikids, however, continued to play a vital role in the Grand Duchy of Lithuania and the later Polish–Lithuanian Commonwealth. Most notably, the Ostrogski family held the title of Grand Hetman of Lithuania and strove to preserve the Ruthenian language and Eastern Orthodoxy in this part of Europe. It is thought that the Drutsk and related princely families may also descend from Roman the Great.

The Rostislaviches were the line of Rostislav I of Kiev, another son of Mstislav I of Kiev, who was Prince of Smolensk and a progenitor of the lines descending from the princes of Smolensk and Yaroslavl.

The Shakhovskoys were founded by Konstantin "Shakh" Glebovich, Prince of Yaroslavl, and traces its lineage to Rostislav I of Kiev through his son Davyd Rostislavich. This branch also descends cognatically of Ivan I of Moscow, through the latter's daughter Evdokia Ivanovna Moskovskaya (1314–1342), who married , Prince of Yaroslavl (died 1345). They were the great-grandparents of Andrey and Yuriy, the first Shakhovskoy princes. This is possibly the most senior extant branch of the Rurikids, with many Shakhovskoys living outside of Russia after having fled during the Russian Revolution.

The Yuryeviches were founded by Yuriy Dolgorukiy, the founder of Moscow and spread vastly in the north-east. Yuri's son Vsevolod the Big Nest was Prince of Vladimir-Suzdal, a precursor state to the Grand Principality of Moscow and thus of the Russian Empire. Vsevolod's son Konstantin of Rostov was Prince of Rostov and the progenitor of various Rostov princely lines. Another son, Ivan Vsevolodich, was Prince of Starodub and progenitor of a number of extant lines, most notably the Gagarin line.

Vsevolod's son Yaroslav II of Vladimir was the father of Alexander Nevsky, whose son Daniel of Moscow sired the ruling house of Moscow until the end of the 16th century.

Beginning with the reign of Ivan the Terrible, the Muscovite branch used the title "Tsar of All Russia" and ruled over the Tsardom of Russia. The death in 1598 of Tsar Feodor I ended the rule of the Rurik dynasty. The dynasty was briefly revived in the person of Vasili IV of Russia, a descendant of Shuyskiy line of the Rurik dynasty, but he died without issue. The unstable period known as the Time of Troubles followed Feodor's death and lasted until 1613.

In that year, Mikhail I ascended the throne, founding the Romanov dynasty that would rule until 1762 and as Holstein-Gottorp-Romanov until the revolutions of 1917. Tsar Mikhail's father Patriarch Filaret of Moscow was descended from the Rurik dynasty through the female line. His mother, Evdokiya Gorbataya-Shuyskaya, was a Rurikid princess from the Shuysky branch, daughter of Alexander Gorbatyi-Shuisky. Tsar Mikhail's first wife Maria Dolgorukova was of Rurikid stock but their marriage produced no children. Emperor Peter III in 1762 brought fresh Rurikid blood to the Romanovs: he and his wife Catherine the Great both descended from the Rurik dynasty. (Catherine the Great descended from a daughter of Yaroslav I (978–1054) through her maternal grandfather, Christian August of Holstein-Gottorp.)

Legacy

Russian and Ukrainian historians have debated for many years about the legacy of the Rurikid dynasty. The Russian view sees the Principality of Moscow ruled by the Rurikid dynasty as the sole heir to the Kievan Rus' civilization, this view is "resting largely on religious-ecclesiastical and historical claims" because Russia was ruled by the Rurikid dynasty until 16th century, while Ukraine was not defined as a state until 20th century. This view started in Moscow as ruled by the original Rurikid dynasty between the 1330s and the late 1850s. The Ukrainian view was formulated much later, between the 1840s and the end of the 1930s in Eastern Austria, and views the Ukrainian descendants of the Rurikid dynasty as its only true successors. The Soviet theory was a modified version of the Russian which "allotted equal rights to the Kievan inheritance to the Three Slavic peoples, that is the Russians, the Ukrainians, and the Belorussians", but later elevated the Russian nation as the elder brother to give the others "needed guidance in revolutionary struggles and socialist construction."

There are currently various extant branches of the Rurikids, for instance: the Houses of Shakhovskoy, Gagarin, and Lobanov-Rostovsky. Whose some of the representatives are: Prince Dmitriy Mikhailovich Shakhovskoy (born 1934), Prince Dmitri Andreevich Gagarin (born 1973) and Prince Nikita Lobanov-Rostovsky (born 1935), a descendant of Prince Konstantin Vasilyevich of Rostov. The three of them are of the Monomakhovichi branch. While the Shakhovskoys claim descent from Mstislav I of Kiev,  the Gagarins, and the Lobanov-Rostovskys are descendants of Vsevolod III of Vladimir, which makes the Shakhovskoys the most senior.

Branches 

Izyaslavichi of Polotsk, princes of Polotsk
Izyaslavichi of Turov, princes of Turiv and Volhynia
Monomakhovichi, princes of Pereyaslav
Izyaslavichi of Monomakh, princes of Volhynia, kings of Rus (senior branch)
Rostislavichi, princes of Smolensk (middle branch)
Yurievichi, princes of Vladimir-Suzdal, Grand Princes of Moscow (junior branch). This branch would reign in Muscovy and the Tsardom of Russia until the 1598 death of Feodor I caused the Time of Troubles.
Shakhovskoy, princes of Yaroslavl (senior extant branch)
Lobanov-Rostovsky, princes of Rostov (middle extant branch)
Gagarin, princes of Starodub-on-the-Klyazma (junior extant branch)
Khilkov, princes of  Starodub-on-the-Klyazma  (junior extant branch)
Mosalsky, princes of Mosalsky (Massalsky)
Olgovichi, princes of Chernihiv
Rostislavichi of Halych, princes of Halych
Kropotkin, princes Kropotkin (extant)
Rzhesvsky, non-titled (extant)
Putyatin, princes Putyatin (extant)
Obolensky, princes Obolensky (extant)
Dolgorukov, princes Dolgorukov (extant; cadet branch of the Obolensky family)
Gorchakov, princes Gorchakov (extant)
Vadbosky, a branch of the princes Belozersky (extant)
Volkonsky, a branch of the princes of Tarusa (extant)
Possibly the Wiśniowiecki family, a branch of the House of Zbaraski (extinct)

Gallery

See also
Grand Prince of Kiev
Shum-gora
Prince of Tver
Knyaz
Symbols of the Rurikids

Notes

References

Bibliography

External links 

 
Rurik Dynasty
1598 disestablishments
States and territories established in the 860s
862 establishments
Russian monarchy
Ukrainian monarchy